Aluminium triethoxide (also Aluminum ethoxide) is a reducing agent that exists as a white powder under room temperature and standard atmospheric pressure. The chemical is mainly used in industrial settings and has played an important role in reducing the cost of the production of bimetallic aluminium catalysts.

Properties 
Aluminium triethoxide is hygroscopic, and decomposes into aluminium hydroxide and ethanol after it absorbs moisture from the air. Aluminium triethoxide is slightly soluble in hot dimethyl benzene, chlorobenzene and other high boiling point non-polar solvents.

Applications 
Aluminium triethoxide is used as a reducing agent for aldehydes and ketones, and is also used as a polymerization catalyst. Aluminium triethoxide is mainly used in Sol-Gel Process preparation of high purity aluminium sesquioxide, which is a polymerization agent.  At the same time, it is used as a reducing reagent, for example, carbonyl compounds that restore to alcohol.

Synthesis methods 
Aluminium triethoxide is produced by the heating reaction of an aluminium amalgam with anhydrous alcohol. All the reagents go through a strict water treatment, and the instrument devices prevent humidity from entering.

Alternatively, aluminium triethoxide is produced by reacting aluminium with anhydrous alcohol, with iodine and mercuric chloride as catalysts.

References 

Aluminium compounds
Ethoxides